Mohamed Abdel Fattah Magid (born 20 November 1976) is an Egyptian cyclist. He competed in the 2000 Summer Olympics.

References

1976 births
Living people
Cyclists at the 2000 Summer Olympics
Egyptian male cyclists
Olympic cyclists of Egypt